Prat de Comte is a municipality in the comarca of Terra Alta, in the province of Tarragona, Catalonia, Spain.

The name of the place has its origins in the Middle Ages, in the words: "el prat donat pel comte", the pasture donated by the Count.

See also
Battle of the Ebro

References

External links

Pàgina web de l'Ajuntament
 Government data pages 

Municipalities in Terra Alta (comarca)
Populated places in Terra Alta (comarca)